Members of the New South Wales Legislative Council who served from 1927 to 1930 were appointed for life by the Governor on the advice of the Premier. This list includes members between the 1927 state election on 8 October 1927 and the 1930 state election on 25 October 1930. The President was Fred Flowers until  14 December 1928 and then Sir John Peden.

See also
Bavin ministry

Notes

References

 

Members of New South Wales parliaments by term
20th-century Australian politicians